Francis Owen  (1745–1774) was a British politician who was elected to the House of Commons in 1774 but was killed in an accident before Parliament met.

Owen was the younger son of William Owen of Porkington Selattyn, Shropshire and his wife Mary Godolphin, daughter of Rev. Henry Godolphin, Dean of St. Paul's and was baptized on 24 February 1745. His uncle Francis Godolphin, 2nd Baron Godolphin was  MP for Helston. Owen was educated at Eton College in 1756, and matriculated at  Pembroke College, Oxford in 1764. In the early 1770s The Swiss-French painter Jean-Étienne Liotard visited England when one of his patrons was James Hamilton, 2nd Earl of Clanbrassil. Clanbrassil was connected with the Godolphin family and was MP for Helston. Liotard painted a portrait of Clanbrassil and subsequently in 1773 a portrait of Owen, dressed in 17th century costume.

At the 1774 general election Owen stood for  Helston on the Godolphin interest and was elected as Member of Parliament  after a contest.  However, before Parliament met, he was killed  by a fall from his horse on 16 November 1774 when a bridge at Walton Derbyshire, which he was riding over, collapsed.  He was unmarried.

References

Sources
Lowell Libson Portrait of Francis Owen by Jean-Étienne Liotard 1773

1745 births
1774 deaths
People educated at Eton College
Alumni of Pembroke College, Oxford
Members of the Parliament of Great Britain for English constituencies
British MPs 1774–1780